Paradiancistrus is a genus of viviparous brotulas.

Species
There are currently four recognized species in this genus:
 Paradiancistrus acutirostris Schwarzhans, Møller & J. G. Nielsen, 2005 (Sharpnosed coralbrotula)
 Paradiancistrus christmasensis Schwarzhans & Møller, 2011 (Christmas viviparous brotula)
 Paradiancistrus cuyoensis Schwarzhans, Møller & J. G. Nielsen, 2005 (Cuyo coralbrotula)
 Paradiancistrus lombokensis Schwarzhans & Møller, 2007 (Lombok viviparous brotula)

References

Bythitidae